Electronic Attack Squadron 129 (VAQ-129) is the United States Navy's only EA-18G Growler training squadron. Known as the "Vikings", they are a Fleet Replacement Squadron, or FRS, and are charged with training all EA-18G aviators and developing standard operating procedures for the maintenance and operation of the aircraft.  The squadron is permanently stationed at Naval Air Station Whidbey Island, in Puget Sound, Washington.

Operational history

VAH-10
Heavy Attack Squadron 10 (VAH-10) was established on 1 May 1961 and originally equipped with the A-3 Skywarrior.

During the Vietnam War detachments from VAH-10 were deployed on the following aircraft carriers operating on Yankee and Dixie Stations:
 
14 April-14 December 1964, Detachment A-3Bs were embarked on 
5 May 1964 – 1 February 1965, A-3Bs were embarked on 
21 June 1966 – 21 February 1967, Detachment 42 A-3Bs were embarked on 
6 June-15 September 1967, Detachment 59 KA-3Bs were embarked on 
10 April-16 December 1968, Detachment 66 KA-3Bs were embarked on 
7 September 1968 – 18 April 1969, Detachment 43 KA-3Bs were embarked on 
26 October 1968 – 17 May 1969, Detachment 61 KA-3Bs were embarked on 
2 August 1969 – 15 April 1970, Detachment 19 KA-3Bs were embarked on 
5 March-17 December 1970, Detachment 38 KA-3Bs were embarked on 
22 October 1970 – 3 June 1971, Detachment 62 KA-3Bs were embarked on USS Hancock

VAQ-129
VAH-10 was re-designated Tactical Electronic Warfare Squadron One Two Nine (TACELECWARON129) (VAQ-129) flying the EA-6B Prowlers on September 1, 1970. The change in name brought with it a change in mission. The first EA-6B standard version Prowler was delivered in January 1971.  With its arrival, VAQ-129 commenced its career as the Fleet Replacement Squadron for EA-6B fleet commands.

In January 1977, the Navy introduced the first of its Improved Capability (ICAP) version Prowlers. In March 1977, VAQ-129 began training United States Marine Corps aircrew and maintenance personnel to fly and maintain the ICAP version of the aircraft, starting a long training relationship with the Marine Corps. In 1984, the first ICAP II version of the EA-6B arrived.

The Vikings introduced the AGM-88A High Speed Anti-Radiation Missile (HARM) to the EA-6B in 1986 and the Lancers (VAQ-131) were the first to successfully fire the AGM-88 from the EA-6B. In 1988 they introduced the new “Block 86” version of the ICAP II Prowler. During Operation Desert Storm, an updated HARM capability was introduced, which proved tremendously successful in the subsequent combat operations.

August 1992 saw the Executive Officer's billet filled by a USMC Lieutenant Colonel, further strengthening VAQ-129's relationship with the Marine Corps.  In the summer of 2005 the new ICAP III was delivered to the community to pave the way for the follow on platform of the EA-18G.

The retirement of the United States Air Force's EF-111A Raven made the EA-6B and EA-18G the only tactical aircraft in the U.S. inventory capable of performing electronic attack.

On 5 August 2009, EA-18G Growlers from VAQ-129 and Electronic Attack Squadron 132 (VAQ-132) completed their first at-sea carrier-arrested landing (trap) aboard .

In 2013, VAQ-129 began training Royal Australian Air Force aircrew to operate the EA-18G.

See also
 History of the United States Navy
 List of United States Navy aircraft squadrons

Notes

References

Online
 VAQ-129's official website
 VAQ-129 Viking's page at globalsecurity.org

Military units and formations in Washington (state)
Electronic attack squadrons of the United States Navy